{{Automatic taxobox
| image = Ocyropsis fusca by OpenCage.jpg
| image_caption = Ocyropsis fusca
| taxon = Ocyropsis
| authority = Mayer, 1912
| subdivision = See text.}}
Ocyropsis is a genus of Ctenophores, which are commonly known as Comb Jellies. Ocyropsis belong to the family of Ocyropsidae. Ocyropsis possesses two large lateral muscular lobes and four auricles, and appear pale and translucent in color. Ocyropsis habitat is not precise as their gelatinous composition can make it difficult to study. They have been found in warm and cold waters. Unlike other, slow swimming Ctenophores, Ocyropsis are efficient in evading their predators. They use their oral lobes for additional propulsion and a secrete luminous mucous in efforts to evade predators. The muscular oral lobes of the Ocyropsis are used to grab its prey, and then moved to the prehensile mouth for absorption.

 Distribution 

 Habitat 
There is lack of knowledge known about Ctenophores habitats. Ocyropsis have been found in both warm and cold waters. They were found and photographed specifically near South Africa near Southern Mozambique to False Bay. There have also been reports of Ocyropsis found near the Madeira Archipelago specifically near Port Santo. The two spotting occurred at 2m- 6m in depth. This sighting at Port Santo, has been the furthest North Atlantic Ocean sighting of an Ocyposis. Typically found in subtropical epielagic water along the Northeastern Pacific. Other sightings have included Southern California, Gulf of Mexico, Western Pacific, and the Indian Ocean.

 Movement 
Typically Ctenophores are slow swimmers that use cilia based propulsion to swim. Due to their slow movement, it puts them at a disadvantage to predators. Unlike the other Ctenophores, Ocyropsis have an advanced method of propulsion for swimming. They have broad oral lobes, typical used for feeding, that are used to row for extra propulsion. They use their broad oral lobes in addition with ciliary current for locomotion. Ocyropsis swimming speeds have been found to be double top speeds of other gelatinous species. They have  been found to be more successful in invading predators at night than during the day. Once they are startled, they begin to use their jet propulsion and release a luminous mucous that causes confusion to predators as well.

 Eating habits 
Ocyropsis forage horizontally, and while they eat create a small wake. This wake is created from the intense compression of the organisms body and location of the ctene rows. The muscular oral lobes of the Ocyropsis are used to grab its prey, and then moved to the prehensile mouth for absorption.

 Morphology 
Ocyropsis shape is noted as looking like two hands together praying, and are pale and translucent in color. The shape consists of two large lateral muscular lobes and 4 auricles varying in size. The lateral lobes extend beyond the mouth no more than about 5 cm. Oftentimes the lobes will be found with pigmented spots of brown or black. The sub-tentacular ctene row is shorter in length than the sub-stomadeal ctene row. Specifically sub-tentacular ctene rows having 25-27 ctene plates compared to sub-stomdeal ctene rows having 35-37 ctene plates. Ctenophores are named after their cilia rows used in movement. A ctene row is enragement of cilia. As Ocryposis age they no longer have their tentacles or have less.

 Species include 
 Ocyropsis crystallina (Rang, 1826)
 Ocyropsis fusca (Rang, 1826)
 Ocyropsis maculata (Rang, 1826)
 Ocyropsis pteroessa Bigelow, 1904
 Ocyropsis vance'' Gershwin, Zeidler & Davie, 2010

References 

Ctenophore genera